Christmas Gaither Vocal Band Style is a Christmas album released by gospel group Gaither Vocal Band on September 30, 2008.

Track listing

Awards
Christmas Gaither Vocal Band Style was nominated for a Dove Award for Christmas Album of the Year at the 40th GMA Dove Awards.

Chart performance

The album peaked at number 13 on Billboard's Christian Albums and number 8 on Holiday Albums.

References

External links
Christmas Gaither Vocal Band Style on Amazon

2008 Christmas albums
Christmas albums by American artists
Gospel Christmas albums
Gaither Vocal Band albums